Jordan Dezaria (born 6 November 1996) is a French professional rugby league footballer who last played as a  or  forward for the Catalans Dragons in the Betfred Super League and France at international level. 

He previously played for Catalans in the Super League, the Leigh Centurions in the Betfred Championship, and on loan from Leigh at Oldham (Heritage № 1400) and Workington Town in Betfred League 1. Dezaria has also played for Toulouse Olympique in the Championship.

Background
Dezaria was born in Avignon, Salon-de-Provence, France.

Career
He made his Super League debut in a match against the Warrington Wolves in June 2016.
In October 2017 Dezaria signed for the Leigh Centurions on a two-year contract.
In December 2020 Catalans re-signed Dezaria along with Gavin Marguerite

International career
He was selected in France 9s squad for the 2019 Rugby League World Cup 9s.
Dezaria scored the opening try for France in their 2021 Rugby League World Cup campaign as they defeated Greece 34-12.

References

External links
Leigh Centurions profile
Catalans Dragons profile
SL profile
France profile
French profile

1996 births
Living people
Sportspeople from Avignon
AS Saint Estève players
Catalans Dragons players
France national rugby league team players
French rugby league players
Leigh Leopards players
Oldham R.L.F.C. players
People from Salon-de-Provence
Rugby league second-rows
Sportspeople from Bouches-du-Rhône
Toulouse Olympique players
Workington Town players